Phi Sigma Nu is the oldest and largest Native American fraternity in the United States. It was founded in 1996 in North Carolina.

History
Phi Sigma Nu is a Native American fraternity founded on February 13, 1996 at the University of North Carolina at Pembroke.  It is the first national Native American Indian fraternity to be formed in the United States.

The Fraternity is governed by a National Chief Council, an elected body of national officers presided over by a Chief President. The current Chief President is Dr. Lawrence T. Locklear.

Traditions
The Mission Statement of Phi Sigma Nu is:
We, the Brothers of Phi Sigma Nu, empower Native Men to collectively engage in academic, social, cultural and physical realms to promote and inspire growth in tribal families, tribal communities, the United States of America and the world at large.

The Motto of Phi Sigma Nu is "Men of Valor. Men of Pride."

The Fraternity's seven founding Principles are:
Leadership
Individuality
Community
Honesty
Wisdom
Pride
Unity

The fraternity uses no alcohol in its ceremonies or initiation, as these ceremonies are viewed as a purifying processes.

The Fraternity is recognized by the Association of Fraternity/Sorority Advisors.

As of August 29, 2020 the Fraternity reports it has more than 400 brothers representing more than 55 tribes.

Chapters
Expanding into multiple states, Phi Sigma Nu numbers 12 chapters, including three active provisional chapters. Additionally the Fraternity recognizes three professional chapters. Active chapters in bold, inactive chapters in italics.

Professional Chapters 
The Fraternity provides for alumni and volunteer networking after graduation with "Professional Chapters" that are formed to provide local alumni support of campus chapters.

See also 
 Alpha Pi Omega sorority
 Cultural interest fraternities and sororities
 List of social fraternities and sororities

References 

Native American organizations
Fraternities and sororities in the United States
Student organizations established in 1996
1996 establishments in North Carolina
Native American history of North Carolina